Daelin Hayes (born May 16, 1998) is an American football outside linebacker for the Baltimore Ravens of the National Football League (NFL). He played college football for Notre Dame.

Early life and high school
Hayes grew up in Belleville, Michigan and initially attended St. Mary's Preparatory in Orchard Lake Village, Michigan. He moved to California after his sophomore year and enrolled at St. Bonaventure High School, where he played football for half of a season before moving back to Michigan and transferring to Cass Technical High School in Detroit. Hayes transferred to Skyline High School in Ann Arbor, Michigan going into his senior year. He was rated a five star recruit and initially committed to play college football at USC while he was at St. Mary's. Hayes decommitted as a senior and ultimately chose Notre Dame.

College career

Hayes played five seasons for the Notre Dame Fighting Irish and joined the team as an early enrollee. He became a starter as a sophomore after being part of Notre Dame's defensive line rotation as a freshman. He recorded 31 tackles and two sacks with a forced fumble as a junior. Hayes suffered a shoulder injury four games into his senior season and used a medical redshirt. Hayes returned for a fifth season and finished the year with 17 tackles, six tackles for loss, and three sacks with an interception and two forced fumbles.

Statistics

Professional career

Baltimore Ravens
Hayes was drafted in the fifth round, 171st overall, of the 2021 NFL draft by the Baltimore Ravens. On May 12, 2021, Hayes officially signed with the Ravens. He was placed on injured reserve with an ankle injury he suffered in Week 3 game against the Detroit Lions on September 27, 2021. He was activated on December 25, 2021. He was placed back on injured reserve on January 1, 2022.

On August 30, 2022, Hayes was waived/injured by the Ravens and placed on injured reserve.

NFL career statistics

References

External links
Notre Dame Fighting Irish bio

Living people
Players of American football from Michigan
Sportspeople from Wayne County, Michigan
American football defensive ends
Notre Dame Fighting Irish football players
People from Belleville, Michigan
1998 births
Baltimore Ravens players